Thelotrema is a genus of lichenized fungi in the family Graphidaceae, the family to which all taxa in the former Thelotremataceae now belong.

Members of the genus Thelotrema are commonly called barnacle lichens.

Species
, Species Fungorum (in the Catalogue of Life) accepts 165 species of Thelotrema.

Thelotrema adjectum 
Thelotrema africanum 
Thelotrema ahtii 
Thelotrema albidopallens 
Thelotrema allosporoides 
Thelotrema amabilis 
Thelotrema amazonicum 
Thelotrema armellense 
Thelotrema attenuatum 
Thelotrema australiense 
Thelotrema berendsohnii 
Thelotrema berkeleyanum 
Thelotrema bicuspidatum 
Thelotrema biliranum 
Thelotrema byssoideum 
Thelotrema californicum 
Thelotrema cameroonense 
Thelotrema canarense 
Thelotrema canescens 
Thelotrema capense 
Thelotrema capetribulense 
Thelotrema catastictum 
Thelotrema cinerellum 
Thelotrema cinereovirens 
Thelotrema colobicum 
Thelotrema conferendum 
Thelotrema confertum 
Thelotrema configuratum 
Thelotrema crassisporum 
Thelotrema crateriforme 
Thelotrema crespoae 
Thelotrema cubanum 
Thelotrema cyphelloides 
Thelotrema defectum 
Thelotrema defossum 
Thelotrema demersum 
Thelotrema demissum 
Thelotrema depressum 
Thelotrema dignitosum 
Thelotrema dislaceratum 
Thelotrema dissultum 
Thelotrema dominicanum 
Thelotrema elmeri 
Thelotrema endoxanthum 
Thelotrema eungellaense 
Thelotrema euphorbiae 
Thelotrema expansum 
Thelotrema exsertum 
Thelotrema farinaceum 
Thelotrema fijiense 
Thelotrema fissiporum 
Thelotrema flavescens 
Thelotrema floridense 
Thelotrema formosanum 
Thelotrema foveolare 
Thelotrema fuscosubtile 
Thelotrema galactizans 
Thelotrema gallowayanum 
Thelotrema gomezianum 
Thelotrema granatum 
Thelotrema grossimarginatum 
Thelotrema harmandii 
Thelotrema hawaiiense 
Thelotrema heladivense 
Thelotrema hnatiukii 
Thelotrema hypomelaenum 
Thelotrema hypoprotocetraricum 
Thelotrema indicum 
Thelotrema infundibulare 
Thelotrema inscalpens 
Thelotrema inspersoporinaceum 
Thelotrema integrellum 
Thelotrema isidiophorum 
Thelotrema isidiosum 
Thelotrema jugale 
Thelotrema kalakkadense 
Thelotrema kalarense 
Thelotrema kamatii 
Thelotrema kinabaluense 
Thelotrema lacteum 
Thelotrema laurisilvae 
Thelotrema lecanodeum 
Thelotrema lepademersum 
Thelotrema lepadinum 
Thelotrema leprocarpoides 
Thelotrema leucocarpum 
Thelotrema leucocheilum 
Thelotrema lirellizans 
Thelotrema lueckingii 
Thelotrema macrosporum 
Thelotrema manosporum 
Thelotrema marginatum 
Thelotrema megasporum 
Thelotrema meridense 
Thelotrema minarum 
Thelotrema minisporum 
Thelotrema mongkolsukii 
Thelotrema monospermum 
Thelotrema monosporum 
Thelotrema murinum 
Thelotrema nipponicum 
Thelotrema nostalgicum 
Thelotrema occlusum 
Thelotrema oleosum 
Thelotrema osornense 
Thelotrema paludosum 
Thelotrema papillosum 
Thelotrema parvisporum 
Thelotrema parvizebrinum 
Thelotrema patwardhanii 
Thelotrema pauperculum 
Thelotrema perriei 
Thelotrema philippinum 
Thelotrema phliuense 
Thelotrema pidurutalagalum 
Thelotrema piluliferum 
Thelotrema poeltii 
Thelotrema polythecium 
Thelotrema porinoides 
Thelotrema profundum 
Thelotrema pruinosum 
Thelotrema pseudosimilans 
Thelotrema pseudosubtile 
Thelotrema quitoense 
Thelotrema reunionis 
Thelotrema rhamni-purshianae 
Thelotrema rhododiscum 
Thelotrema rhodothecium 
Thelotrema rockii 
Thelotrema rugatulum 
Thelotrema samaranum 
Thelotrema saxicola 
Thelotrema scabrosum 
Thelotrema sendaiense 
Thelotrema similans 
Thelotrema simplex 
Thelotrema sitianum 
Thelotrema stenosporum 
Thelotrema stromatiferum 
Thelotrema subadjectum 
Thelotrema subexpallescens 
Thelotrema subgeminum 
Thelotrema subgranulosum 
Thelotrema subhiatum 
Thelotrema submyriocarpum 
Thelotrema suboccultum 
Thelotrema subsphaerosporum 
Thelotrema subweberi 
Thelotrema suecicum 
Thelotrema tetrasporum 
Thelotrema thesaurum 
Thelotrema triseptatum 
Thelotrema tristanense 
Thelotrema trypethelioides 
Thelotrema umbonatum 
Thelotrema umbratum 
Thelotrema velatum 
Thelotrema verrucorugosum 
Thelotrema verruculosum 
Thelotrema weberi 
Thelotrema wilsoniorum 
Thelotrema zenkeri 
Thelotrema zimbabwense

References

Ostropales
Lichen genera
Taxa named by Erik Acharius
Ostropales genera
Taxa described in 1803